Toby Truslove is an Australian film, theatre and television actor.

Career
In 2001, Truslove appeared on the television drama series Crash Palace as Bryan Rossiter. He has since made guest appearances on Australian TV series including All Saints, McLeod's Daughters, The Strip, Thank God You're Here and The Librarians.

In 2011 he starred in two ABC TV comedy series Laid and Outland. He also appears in the comedy feature Scumbus. In 2012 he was the lead in The Strange Calls. Onstage he has played Sam in the Belvoir St. Theatre's 2012 production of Strange Interlude, as well as the pompous Victor Prynne in Noël Coward's play Private Lives – another Belvoir production.

Truslove was one of the team captains on Channel 7's Slide Show and currently stars in the comedy TV series Utopia.

Truslove co-hosted the 2014 New Year's Eve broadcast for the ABC with Julia Zemiro.

References

External links
 

Living people
Year of birth missing (living people)
Australian male television actors
Australian male film actors